The Mayotte national football team represents the French overseas department and region of Mayotte in international football.

Mayotte is a member of neither FIFA nor CAF, so it is not eligible to enter the World Cup or the African Cup of Nations. Till 2007, Mayotte had played two friendly matches against the French overseas island of Réunion and three against Madagascar.

In 2007, the team competed for the first time in the Indian Ocean Games, finishing in third position after losing against Madagascar in the semi-final and beating Mauritius in the third-place playoff after a penalty-shootout.

In 2012, the team in Coupe de l'Outre-Mer Beat Tahiti champions of OFC Nations Cup 3–1. also beat New Caledonia champions of Pacific Games and Runners-Up of OFC Nations Cup 2–0.

Mayotte Football Achievements

Indian Ocean Island Games

Coupe de l'Outre-Mer 
Mayotte has participated in both editions of the Coupe de l'Outre-Mer, which was established in 2008.

Fixtures and results

Head-to-Head Records against other countries

Team

Current squad
The following The players were selected to the squad for the 2019 Indian Ocean Island Games:

Notable players

  Adifane Noussoura - played for professional team Lincoln City

Honours
This is a list of honours for the senior Mayotte team

Coupe de l'Outre-Mer
 Fourth Place : 2010, 2012

Indian Ocean Island Games
 Silver Medal  : 2015
 Bronze Medal  : 2007, 2019
 Fourth Place : 2011

References

External links
Official website 
Mayotte at Elo Ratings

 
Football in Mayotte
African national association football teams
National football teams of Overseas France